The Staxtonbury Family Music Festival, commonly abbreviated to Staxtonbury, is a local British music festival, held every year at Staxton, near Scarborough, North Yorkshire, best known for its break through local music acts.

The festival has run since 2009, and has been very successful, not just with local people but a wider audience. 

The size and nature of the festival, held over three or four days in the open air, with performers, crew and paying festival goers staying in tents, caravans and motorhomes, has meant that the weather is significant. It is now attended by around 10,000 annually.

Lineups

Artists 
2011
 My Forever
 Stray Scene
 Shamrockers
 Attic Noise 
 Blue Alibi
 The Shamrockers
 Big Me 
 Amber Carey
 Stairwell 17
 The Grand Urge
 Rebecca Arundale

2012 
Staxtonbury IV 2012 was held on Friday 6th, Saturday 7th & Sunday 8 July 2012.

2015 
Staxtonbury VII (2015) was held from 3–5 July 2015.

Artists 
The Sherlocks
Shamrockers
Snatch
Huge
Friday Street
Qwikshift
Kast Off Kinks
Bogus Beatles
Soul Rida
Aftermath
Another Manhattan
Trilogy
TFI
Dustin the Blues

2016 

The 8th festival was held from 2–4 July 2016.

2017 

Staxtonbury IX was held from 7–9 July 2017.

2018 

The festival was held between 6 and 8 July, over 40 acts appeared. Including local celebrity and presenter Ryan Swain.

2019 

The 11th festival was held from 4–6 July in 2019. It had 4 stages and featured performances on the main stage from Soul Rida, Boomin, Huge, Friday Street and DJ's Callum Russell and Ryan Swain. The festival had completely sold out of online ticket sales for the Saturday.

See also 
 Staxton
 Glastonbury
 List of music festivals in the United Kingdom

References 

Music festivals in North Yorkshire
Scarborough, North Yorkshire